Vopnafjörður Airport  is an airport serving the village of Vopnafjörður, in the Eastern Region (Austurland) of Iceland.

Airlines and destinations

Statistics

Passengers and movements

Notes

References

External links 

 Official online guide to Vopnafjordur

Airports in Iceland